Solontsy is a rural locality (a selo) and the administrative center of Solontsinsky Rural Settlement, Veydelevsky District, Belgorod Oblast, Russia. The population was 741 as of 2010. There are 9 streets.

Geography 
Solontsy is located 22 km southeast of Veydelevka (the district's administrative centre) by road. Stanovoye is the nearest rural locality.

References 

Rural localities in Veydelevsky District